Brandon Clagette (born April 30, 2002) is an American soccer player who plays for the Northwestern Wildcats in the NCAA Division I.

Club career 
Clagette spent his youth soccer development with the Atlanta United Academy. On July 13, 2019, Clagette appeared for Atlanta United 2, the USL Championship affiliate of Atlanta United FC, starting in a loss to New York Red Bulls II.

Clagette spent time competing with SSA Kings during the 2021 and 2022 summer USL2 league .

References

External links 

2002 births
Living people
People from Douglasville, Georgia
Sportspeople from the Atlanta metropolitan area
Soccer players from Georgia (U.S. state)
American soccer players
Association football defenders
Pittsburgh Panthers men's soccer players
Atlanta United 2 players
USL Championship players